is a kaiju who first appeared in Toho's 1967 film Son of Godzilla. He is the adopted son of Godzilla, and is sometimes referenced as Minya in the American dubbed versions.

Overview
Introduced in Son of Godzilla, Minilla was born on Sollgel Island, when his egg was prematurely cracked open by a group of mutant giant mantises called Kamacuras. Godzilla soon arrived, killed two of the Kamacuras, and rescued Minilla. Godzilla proceeded to train Minilla and defended it against further attacks from the final Kamacuras and the giant spider Kumonga. Godzilla and Minilla were placed in hibernation when a group of scientists completed a weather experiment, resulting in the freezing of their island. The monsters were revived when the snow melted, and eventually relocated to Monster Island, as seen via stock footage in Godzilla vs. Gigan.

In Destroy All Monsters, Minilla, Godzilla, and many other Earth monsters live on a new island called Monsterland. Together they battle the three-headed space dragon King Ghidorah at Mount Fuji. They kill Ghidorah and save planet Earth. After, Minilla and the other monsters return to Monsterland.

In Godzilla: Final Wars, Minilla accompanies a young boy and the boy's grandfather on an adventure around Japan before convincing his father not to attack the crew of the Gotengo, afterwards leaving with Godzilla into the ocean.

The children's web-series Godziban has Minilla and Little Godzilla co-existing as Godzilla's kid brothers, embarking on many misadventures while Godzilla tries to teach them important monster skills.

Development
According to director Jun Fukuda, Minilla's creation was not an attempt at appealing to child audiences, but was merely a new approach for the series. After filming Ebirah, Horror of the Deep, Godzilla creator Tomoyuki Tanaka reportedly approached screenwriter Shinichi Sekizawa and suggested the idea of giving Godzilla a son to commemorate the New Year. According to Godzilla historian Steve Ryfle, the character's creation was likely a response to the contemporary light-hearted Gamera films.

Appearances

Films
 Son of Godzilla (1967)
 Destroy All Monsters (1968)
 All Monsters Attack aka Godzilla's Revenge (1969)
 Godzilla: Final Wars (2004)

Television
 Ike! Greenman (1973–1974)

Video games
 Godzilla / Godzilla-Kun: Kaijuu Daikessen (Game Boy – 1990) – In the game, Minilla is trapped in a large maze. He awaits rescue by Godzilla, the player's character. The only point in which Minilla appears is during the ending sequence.
 Godzilla Trading Battle (PlayStation – 1998)
 Godzilla Generations (Dreamcast – 1998) – A secret character that is unlocked after completing the game with Godzilla-USA, Minilla is the shortest of the playable characters and also the weakest in terms of defense. His speed is average, and his breath weapon, atomic smoke rings, is not very powerful, as several uses are required to defeat even the Super X.

Cultural references
 In the M*A*S*H* episode "Springtime", Radar O'Reilly asks a nurse played by Mary Kay Place if she would like to accompany him to a screening of "Firstborn of Godzilla" and remarks, "I saw the original—before Godzilla got married" (however the Korean War lasted between 1950 and 1953, but Godzilla himself did not appear on-screen until 1954).
 Doom metal band Goblin Cock have a song on their debut album titled "Ichiro's Dilemma" which summarizes the plot of the film All Monsters Attack and mentions Minya (the alternate name for Minilla sometimes used in English dubs).

Other juvenile Godzillas

 Godzooky, Godzilla's nephew from the 1978-81 animated television series Godzilla.
 Godzilla Junior (also referred to as Little Godzilla and Baby Godzilla), Godzilla's second son, introduced in the 1993 film Godzilla vs. Mechagodzilla II.
 Baby Godzilla, from the 1998 film Godzilla and the 1998–2000 animated television series Godzilla: The Series.

References

Fictional dinosaurs
Fictional telepaths
Fictional mutants
Godzilla characters
Mothra characters
Toho monsters
Science fiction film characters
Fantasy film characters
Film characters introduced in 1967
Kaiju
Fictional monsters